Nicholas Peter Warner,  (born 22 May 1950) is an Australian diplomat, intelligence official, public servant, and the Director-General of the Office of National Intelligence since 20 December 2018. 

Warner served as the director-general of the Office of National Assessments from December 2017 to December 2018, the director-general Australian Secret Intelligence Service (ASIS) from August 2009 to December 2017, and the secretary of the Australian Department of Defence from December 2006 to August 2009. He is best known and highly respected for his role in "RAMSI" as the Special Coordinator of the Regional Assistance Mission to Solomon Islands.

Education
Born in Singapore, Warner holds a Bachelor of Arts degree with honours in history and Asian studies and a Master of Arts degree in history from the Australian National University (ANU).

Career
 
Joint Intelligence Organisation (JIO):
(1973–77) Worked in the JIO

Office of National Assessments (ONA): 
(1979–88), Deputy head, Current Intelligence Branch and National Assessments Officer for Africa
(1980) Australian Liaison Office, Salisbury, Rhodesia

Department of Foreign Affairs and Trade (DFAT):
(1988–89) Director, South Asia, Africa, Middle East Trade Section
(1989–90) Head, Australian Liaison Office, Namibia during the Australian contribution to UNTAG
(1990–91) Director, Central and Southern Africa Section
(1991–93) Deputy head of mission, Australian Permanent Mission to the Supreme National Council, Cambodia
(1994–97) Australian ambassador to Iran
(1997–98) Assistant secretary, Parliamentary and Media Branch and Senior Spokesman
(1997–98) Acting first assistant secretary, Public Affairs and Consular Division
(1998–99) First assistant secretary, South and South East Asia Division
(1999–2003) High commissioner, Papua New Guinea
(2003) First assistant secretary, South Pacific, Africa and Middle East Division
(2003–2004) Special coordinator of the Regional Assistance Mission to Solomon Islands (RAMSI)
(2004–2005) Deputy secretary, Department of Foreign Affairs and Trade

Prime Minister's Office (PMO):
(2005–2006) Senior adviser (International) to the prime minister

Australian Department of Defence:
(4 December 2006 – August 2009) Secretary of Defence

Department of Foreign Affairs and Trade (DFAT):
(17 August 2009 – 18 December 2017) Director-general, Australian Secret Intelligence Service (ASIS)

Department of the Prime Minister and Cabinet (PM&C):
(18 December 2017–20 December 2018) Director-general of the Office of National Assessments (ONA)
(20 December 2018–) Director-general of the Office of National Intelligence (ONI)

Honours
Warner was awarded the Public Service Medal in 2006 for outstanding public service as High Commissioner to Port Moresby, Special Coordinator for the Regional Assistance Mission to Solomon Islands and leader of the Emergency Response Team which dealt with the kidnapping in Baghdad of Mr Douglas Wood. On 13 June 2011, he was named an Officer of the Order of Australia for distinguished service to public sector leadership through the development of policy, administration and reform in the areas of intelligence, defence and international relations.

References and notes

External links
 Official photo (copyright)

1950 births
Living people
Directors-General of the Australian Secret Intelligence Service
Officers of the Order of Australia
Recipients of the Public Service Medal (Australia)
Australian National University alumni
Ambassadors of Australia to Iran
High Commissioners of Australia to Papua New Guinea
Secretaries of the Australian Department of Defence